Evelyn is a radio play by Rhys Adrian, first broadcast on BBC Radio 4 on 21 October 1969. It was later adapted for television as part of BBC1's Play for Today series which was transmitted on 28 October 1971.

Synopsis
The play is largely a two-hander comprising a series of vignettes featuring pillow talk between the characters referred to in the script simply as 'The Man' and 'The Girl'. He is a city professional in his mid-thirties, she is a middle class housewife in her early twenties; both are enjoying an extra-marital affair, meeting every Tuesday afternoon to make love while The Girl's husband works late at the office.

During one of their liaisons, The Girl claims to love both The Man and her husband equally. Troubled by this revelation, he gently persuades her to leave her husband and commit to him. The Girl does not consider this practical, and reveals that, besides her husband, The Man is not the only lover in her life. The Man grows increasingly paranoid that he will soon be replaced in The Girl's affections.

In an attempt to keep their love for each other alive, he invents a mistress called Evelyn who he intends to leave, along with his wife, so that he can be with The Girl – believing that this will finally persuade her to abandon her other lovers for him. Their meetings soon become more infrequent as The Girl begins to spend more time with her new lover, Peter. Despite the growing distance between them, The Girl reassures The Man that she still loves him. The play ends with a telephone conversation between the two, The Man suggesting times and places for them to meet, only for The Girl to inform him that she is unavailable. As she is about to hang up she tells The Man once more that she loves him, replaces the receiver and sighs wearily.

Evelyn was first broadcast on BBC Radio 4 on 1969. It was awarded the RAI Prize for Literary and Dramatic Programmes at the Prix Italia in 1970.

Radio cast
 Ian Richardson as The Man
 Pauline Collins as The Girl
 Geoffrey Collins as Peter

References

Sources
 Best Radio Plays of 1982 (Methuen; 1983)
 John Drakakis (Ed.), British Radio Drama (Cambridge University Press; 1981)

External links
 The Diversity Website
 The British Television Drama Website

1969 radio dramas
BBC Radio 4 programmes
British radio dramas
Works by Rhys Adrian